Little Otter is an unincorporated community in the Otter District of Braxton County, near Gassaway, West Virginia, United States.

The community takes its name from nearby Little Otter Creek.

References 

Unincorporated communities in Braxton County, West Virginia
Unincorporated communities in West Virginia